Monte Moir (born September 10, 1958) is an American songwriter, producer and musician best known as the keyboardist of Morris Day's band The Time and songwriter of many notable American artists.

Biography
Monte Moir is the original and current keyboardist for The Time, as well as a songwriter and producer for Janet Jackson, Alexander O'Neal, Gladys Knight, as well as the duo Deja (Curt Jones & Starleana Young). He is also credited for working with Prince, Vanity 6, Deniece Williams, Thelma Houston, Steven Dante, Lolly Pop, Precious Wilson and various other artists.

Some of his greatest writing successes were writing the first side of Alexander O'Neal's solo debut – including "If You Were Here Tonight" and "The Pleasure Principle' by Janet Jackson. Patti Austin and Thelma Houston are other notable artists he wrote classics for as part of Jimmy Jam and Terry Lewis's 'The Secret'. Monte is something of a cult writing figure in the world of soulful music. "In My Life" by Ruby Turner as well as Steven Dante's "It's Only Love" are key examples of his songwriting.

He left The Time soon after Jam and Lewis were released by Prince, following conflicting writing interests with The SOS Band and failing to make a concert. However, he rejoined The Time for their Pandemonium album and Prince's film Graffiti Bridge, in the late 1980s when the original Time members reunited.

Monte Moir continues to produce his own material, play keyboards for an amended version of the band and to produce for various artists. He most recently surfaced on the 59th Annual Grammy Awards with The Time, and was credited on Rihanna's 2016 Grammy nominated track "Work".

References

External links
MySpace site
All Music – Credits
Discography on Discogs

American funk keyboardists
Living people
American rhythm and blues musicians
The Original 7ven members
Musicians from Minneapolis
1958 births